Ceneda may refer to:
 Ceneda, Italy, frazione of Vittorio Veneto
Duchy of Ceneda, medieval duchy of which Ceneda was capital